Carex pallescens, called pale sedge, is a widespread species of flowering plant in the genus Carex, native to the northeastern United States, eastern Canada, Iceland, Europe, Tunisia, and western Asia. It has unstable chromosome numbers.

References

pallescens
Taxa named by Carl Linnaeus
Plants described in 1753